Alydus conspersus is a species of broad-headed bug in the family Alydidae. It is found in North America.

Subspecies
These three subspecies belong to the species Alydus conspersus:
 Alydus conspersus conspersus Montandon, 1893
 Alydus conspersus infuscatus Fracker, 1918
 Alydus conspersus rufescens Barber, 1911

References

Articles created by Qbugbot
Insects described in 1893
Alydinae